Equipoise may refer to:
 Clinical equipoise, or the principle of equipoise, a medical research term
 Equilibrioception, the state of being balanced or in equilibrium
 Boldenone undecylenate, an anabolic steroid, by the trade name Equipoise
 Hydroxyzine, an antihistamine, by trade name Equipoise
 Equipoise (Happy Rhodes album), 1993
 Equipoise (Stanley Cowell album), 1979
 Equipoise (Larry Coryell album), 1985
 Equipoise (horse) (1928–1938), a thoroughbred racehorse